Ayrton Andrés Páez Yepez (born 16 January 1995) is a Venezuelan professional footballer who plays as a midfielder for USL League One club Charlotte Independence.

Career

In 2015, Páez joined the reserves of Spanish La Liga side Málaga.

Before the second half of 2016/17, he signed for the reserves of Spanish second division club Numancia from Sabadell in the Spanish third division due to lack of playing time.

In 2017, he signed for Spanish fourth division team Loja.

In 2018, Páez signed for Monagas in Venezuela.

On 18 February 2022, Páez signed with USL League One side Charlotte Independence.

References

External links
 

Living people
1995 births
Venezuelan footballers
Association football midfielders
Expatriate footballers in Spain
Venezuelan expatriate footballers
Venezuelan expatriate sportspeople in Spain
Segunda División B players
Venezuelan Primera División players
Estudiantes de Mérida players
Atlético Malagueño players
Atarfe Industrial CF players
CD Numancia B players
CE Sabadell FC footballers
RCD Mallorca B players
Tercera División players
Loja CD players
Monagas S.C. players
People from Mérida (state)
Charlotte Independence players
USL League One players